Boris Kulayev (18 July 1929 – 12 August 2008) was a Russian wrestler who competed in the 1956 Summer Olympics.

References

External links
 

1929 births
2008 deaths
Olympic wrestlers of the Soviet Union
Wrestlers at the 1956 Summer Olympics
Russian male sport wrestlers
Olympic silver medalists for the Soviet Union
Olympic medalists in wrestling
Medalists at the 1956 Summer Olympics